Accrington was a parliamentary constituency of the House of Commons of the Parliament of the United Kingdom from 1885 to 1983. It elected one Member of Parliament (MP) by the first-past-the-post system of election.

History
The constituency was created by the Redistribution of Seats Act 1885 for the 1885 general election. The original county constituency of North East Lancashire was replaced by a borough constituency for the 1918 general election. The constituency was based on the town of Accrington.

From the 1983 general election, the constituency was abolished. The successor seat was Hyndburn, named after the local government area including the town of Accrington. 85.5% of the new seat came from the former Accrington constituency.

Boundaries
This constituency was part of the historic county of Lancashire in North West England.

1885–1918
The constituency, officially named North East Lancashire, Accrington Division consisted of the Municipal Borough of Accrington, and the parishes of Altham, Church, Clayton-le-Moors, Hapton, Huncoat, Oswaldtwistle, and Rishton.

Neighbouring constituencies were Blackburn to the south west and Burnley to the north east and Darwen to the north. Accrington also had short boundaries with Clitheroe at both its north and east borders and Rossendale to the south and south east.

1918–1950
The Representation of the People Act 1918 reorganised constituencies throughout Great Britain and Ireland. Constituencies were defined in terms of the districts created by the Local Government Act 1894.

The Parliamentary Borough of Accrington consisted of the Municipal Borough of Accrington and the Urban Districts of Church, Clayton-le-Moors, Oswaldtwistle, and Rishton. The three parishes of Altham, Hapton and Huncoat passed to the Clitheroe constituency.

1950–1983
The Representation of the People Act 1948 replaced the term "parliamentary borough" with "borough constituency". The Accrington Borough Constituency was defined in the same terms as in the 1918 legislation. However, there were boundary changes reflecting local government changes in the 1930s: the Huncoat area rejoined the constituency as the parish had been absorbed by the Borough of Accrington, while an enlargement of the county borough of Blackburn took away part of Rishton. These boundaries were first used in the 1950 general election.

Abolition
In 1974 local government in England and Wales was reorganised. However, parliamentary boundaries were not altered until 1983. The Parliamentary Constituencies (England) Order 1983 created new constituencies based on the new districts. A new Hyndburn Borough Constituency was formed. The new seat included the whole of the Accrington constituency with the addition of Altham and Great Harwood.

Members of Parliament

Elections

Elections in the 1880s

Elections in the 1890s

Elections in the 1900s

Elections in the 1910s 

General Election 1914–15:

Another General Election was required to take place before the end of 1915. The political parties had been making preparations for an election to take place and by the July 1914, the following candidates had been selected; 
Labour: James Bell
Liberal: Harold Baker
Unionist: Ernest Gray

Elections in the 1920s

Elections in the 1930s

Elections in the 1940s
General Election 1939–40:

Another General Election was required to take place before the end of 1940. The political parties had been making preparations for an election to take place and by the July 1939, the following candidates had been selected; 
Conservative: Henry Procter
Labour: Walter Scott-Elliot
British Union: Doreen Bell

Elections in the 1950s

Elections in the 1960s

Elections in the 1970s

References and Notes
Notes

References

Sources 
 
 Boundaries of Parliamentary Constituencies 1885–1972, compiled and edited by F.W.S. Craig (Parliamentary Reference Publications 1972)
 British Parliamentary Constituencies: A Statistical Compendium, by Ivor Crewe and Anthony Fox (Faber and Faber 1984)
 British Parliamentary Election Results 1885–1918, compiled and edited by F.W.S. Craig (Macmillan Press 1974)
 British Parliamentary Election Results 1918–1949, compiled and edited by F.W.S. Craig (Macmillan Press, revised edition 1977)
 British Parliamentary Election Results 1950–1973, compiled and edited by F.W.S. Craig (Parliamentary Research Services 1983)
 Who's Who of British Members of Parliament, Volume II 1886–1918, edited by M. Stenton and S. Lees (Harvester Press 1978)
 Who's Who of British Members of Parliament, Volume III 1919–1945, edited by M. Stenton and S. Lees (Harvester Press 1979)
 Who's Who of British Members of Parliament, Volume IV 1945–1979, edited by M. Stenton and S. Lees (Harvester Press 1981)

Parliamentary constituencies in North West England (historic)
Constituencies of the Parliament of the United Kingdom established in 1885
Constituencies of the Parliament of the United Kingdom disestablished in 1983
Accrington
Politics of Hyndburn